The Goddard Rocket Launching Site is a National Historic Landmark commemorating the launch site of the world's first successful liquid-fueled rocket.

History
Dr. Robert H. Goddard launched his historic rocket on March 16, 1926, from what was then the Asa Ward Farm.

Goddard's final launch from Auburn, on July 17, 1929, was also a historic first. The  rocket carried an aneroid barometer, thermometer, and a camera triggered when the parachute opened. All three instruments operated successfully and were recovered.

The site was declared a National Historic Landmark in 1966.

Location
The site is located at 20 Upland Street, Auburn, Massachusetts, within the Pakachoag Golf Course. The launch site is indicated with two markers accessible to visitors while the golf course is open. An obelisk marking the launch site itself is about 1000 feet (300 m) southeast of Upland Street at the "9th Fairway, between Tee and Green," of the Pakachoag Golf Course. This marker may be difficult to access due to the nature of golf. The best advice for visiting is to walk the rock wall between 1st and 9th fairways. A second marker, rectangular in shape, is just off Upland Street in the northwest corner of the golf course. 

The obelisk reads:

See also
List of National Historic Landmarks in Massachusetts
National Register of Historic Places listings in Worcester County, Massachusetts

References

External links

Aviation: From Sand Dunes to Sonic Booms, a National Park Service Discover Our Shared Heritage Travel Itinerary

National Historic Landmarks in Massachusetts
Rocket launch sites in the United States
Monuments and memorials on the National Register of Historic Places in Massachusetts
Buildings and structures in Auburn, Massachusetts
National Register of Historic Places in Worcester County, Massachusetts